KBXB (97.9 FM, "Freedom 97.9") is a radio station licensed to serve Sikeston, Missouri. The station is owned by Withers Broadcasting and licensed to Withers Broadcasting Company of Southeast Missouri, LLC. It airs a classic country music format. KBXB serves Sikeston and Southeast Missouri, Southern Illinois, Western Kentucky, extreme Northwestern Tennessee, and extreme Northeastern Arkansas.

The station was assigned the KBXB call letters by the Federal Communications Commission on June 29, 1996.

On May 27, 2022 at noon, KBXB changed its format from country to classic country, branded as "Freedom 97.9".

Previous logo

References

External links
KBXB official website
Withers Broadcasting Companies

BXB
Classic country radio stations in the United States
Scott County, Missouri
Radio stations established in 1996